Cullen Moss (born July 8, 1975) is an American film, television and voice actor. He is best known for his roles on One Tree Hill and The Notebook.

Early life
Moss is a native of Winston-Salem, North Carolina who graduated from Mount Tabor High School in 1993.

Career
Moss has portrayed a variety of supporting roles; his most notable television roles are Junk on One Tree Hill, Officer Gorman on The Walking Dead, and Joey on Resurrection.

Moss's film work includes The Notebook, Dear John, The Conspirator, and Times Like Dying

Moss has provided the English-version voice for a few Japanese anime such as You're Under Arrest and its motion picture version.

Filmography

Film

Television

Awards and nominations

References

External links 

Living people
American male film actors
American male television actors
Male actors from North Carolina
21st-century American male actors
1981 births